Arend, Arent or Arendt (all pronounced ) is a Dutch masculine given name. Arend means "eagle" in Dutch, but the name derives from Arnoud/Arnout, which itself stems from the Germanic elements aran "eagle" and wald "rule, power". The form Arent also occurs in Norway. People with the name include:

 Arend, Lord of Egmond (c. 1337–1409), Dutch nobility
 Arent Arentsz (1585–1631), Dutch landscape painter
 Arent Berntsen (1610–1680), Dano-Norwegian topographer and statistician
 Arent Greve de Besche (1878–1945), Norwegian bacteriologist
 Arend Bloem (born 1947), Dutch canoer
 Arend Jan Boekestijn (born 1959), Dutch politician
 Arend "Arie" van de Bunt (born 1969), Dutch water polo goalkeeper
 Arent Schuyler Crowninshield (1843–1908), American rear admiral of the United States Navy
 Arent van Curler (1619–1667), Dutch settler in New Netherland
 Arent Schuyler DePeyster (1736–1822), New York-born British military officer 
 Arend Dijckman (1572–1627), Dutch merchant who briefly was Admiral of the Polish Navy
 Arent Nicolai Dragsted (1821–1898), Danish goldsmith
 Arent de Gelder (1645–1727), Dutch painter
 Arend Glas (born 1968), Dutch bobsledder
 Arend Johan van Glinstra (1754–1814), Dutch painter
 Arent Greve (1733–1808), Norwegian jeweler, goldsmith and painter
 Arend "Arie" Haan (born 1948), Dutch football player and coach
 Arend van Halen (1673–1732), Dutch portrait painter
 Arend Hassink (born 1950), Dutch former road bicycle racer
 Arent M. Henriksen (born 1946), Norwegian politician 
 Arend Heyting (1898–1980), Dutch mathematician and logician
 Arend van 't Hoft (born 1933), Dutch racing cyclist
 Arend de Keysere (died 1490), Flemish printer
 Arent Jacobsz Koets (c.1600–1635), Dutch guard painted by Frans Hals
 Arend Langenberg (1949–2012), Dutch voice actor and radio presenter
 Arend Lijphart (born 1936), Dutch political scientist
 Arend Lubbers (born 1931), American college administrator
 Arent Magnin (1825–1888), Dutch Governor of the Gold Coast
 Arent Passer (c.1560–1637), Dutch stonemason in Estonia
  (died 1679), Dutch cartographer
 Arendt de Roy (died 1589), Flemish architect
 Arend Joan Rutgers (1903–1998), Dutch/Belgian physical chemist
 Arend Schoemaker (1911–1982), Dutch footballer
 Arent Schuyler (1662–1730), New Netherland surveyor, merchant, and land speculator, ancestor of Arent DePeyster and Arent Crowninshield
 Arent Gustaf Silfversparre (1727–1818), Swedish baron
 Arend Fokke Simonsz (1755–1812), Dutch writer and intellectual
 Arent Solem (1777–1857), Norwegian merchant 
 Arend von Stryk (born 1970), Namibian footballer
 Arent Van Soelen (1898–?), South African sports sailor
 Arend van der Wel (1933–2013), Dutch footballer
  (1882–1939), Dutch Arabist
 Arend Friedrich Wiegmann (1770–1853), German pharmacist and botanist
 Arend Friedrich August Wiegmann (1802–1841), German zoologist and herpetologist, son of the above

See also
Arndt, a related given name
Arend (surname)

References

Dutch masculine given names